Take Care of Amelia (Italian:Occupati d’Amelia) is a 1925 Italian silent comedy film directed by Telemaco Ruggeri and starring Pina Menichelli, Marcel Lévesque and Elena Lunda. It is based on the 1908 play Occupe-toi d'Amélie! by Georges Feydeau, which has been made into several films. It was the final film to star Menichelli, one of the leading divas of early Italian cinema.

Cast
 Camillo De Riso
 Elena Lunda 
 Marcel Lévesque
 Pina Menichelli as Amelia  
 Carlo Reiter

References

Bibliography
 Angela Dalle Vacche. Diva: Defiance and Passion in Early Italian Cinema. University of Texas Press, 2008.
 Goble, Alan. The Complete Index to Literary Sources in Film. Walter de Gruyter, 1999.

External links 
 

1925 films
1925 comedy films
Italian comedy films
Italian silent feature films
1920s Italian-language films
Films directed by Telemaco Ruggeri
Italian films based on plays
Films based on works by Georges Feydeau
Italian black-and-white films
Silent comedy films
1920s Italian films